Prichard House is a historic home located at Huntington, Cabell County, West Virginia. It was built between 1921 and 1923, and is an Italian Renaissance-style residence. The house is built of gray North Carolina granite, topped by a Spanish tile roof, and sits on a reinforced concrete foundation.  It features a distinctive two story tower and two roof garden chimneys.  At the entrance to the property is the original wrought iron fence supported by granite pillars and iron gates.  Also on the property are complementary and contributing guesthouse / garage and chicken house.

It was listed on the National Register of Historic Places in 2001.

References

Houses completed in 1923
Houses in Huntington, West Virginia
Houses on the National Register of Historic Places in West Virginia
Italian Renaissance Revival architecture in the United States
National Register of Historic Places in Cabell County, West Virginia
Stone houses in West Virginia